Ejaz Durrani (18 April 1935 – 1 March 2021), known mononymously as Ejaz, was a Pakistani film actor, director and producer active from 1956 to 1984. He was married to legendary Pakistani actress-singer Noor Jehan. He is mostly remembered for his portrayal of Ranjha in the film Heer Ranjha (1970). He was especially known for portraying Punjabi culture folk heroes in epic love stories such as Heer Ranjha and Mirza Sahiban.

Life and career
He was born in a village in Jalalpur Jattan, Gujrat District in Pakistan in 1935. He was married to Noor Jehan (21 September 1920 – 23 December 2000) in 1959. and had three daughters with her. His three daughters with Noor Jehan are Hina, Shazia and Nazia. They eventually divorced. Noor Jehan got the custody of their daughters and raised them on her own. He later married film actress Firdous.

Legal troubles
Ejaz was detained for smuggling canabis at the London Heathrow Airport. He was arrested and subsequently spent a few years in prison for it.

Career

As an actor
{{columns-list|colwidth=20em|
Hameeda (1956) (debut film)
Bara Admi (1957)
 Gumrah (1959)
 Raaz (1959)
 Sola Aanay (1959)
 Suchchay Moti (1959)
 Daku Ki Ladki (1960)
 Gulbadan (1960)
 Izzat (1960)
 Manzil (1960)
 Salma (1960)
 Watan (1960)
 Do Raste (1961)
 Farishta (1961)
 Shaheed (1962)
 Azra (1962)
 Ajnabi (1962)
 Dosheeza (1962)
 Barsaat Main (1962)
 Aurat Eik Kahani (1963)
 Dhoop Chaon (1963)
 Baji (1963; cameo appearance)
 Beti (1964)
 Chingari (1964)
 Deewana (1964)
 Gehra Daagh (1964)
 Badnaam (1966)
 Jalwah (1966)
 Sarhad (1966)
 Sawaal (1966)
 Dost Dushman (1967)
 Gunah Gaar (1967)
 Lakhon Mein Aik (1967)
 Mirza Jat (1967)
 Nadira (1967)
 Shab-ba-Khair (1967)
 Yatim (1967)
 Bauji (1968)
 Behan Bhai (1968)
 Beti Beta (1968)
 Dhoop Aur Saey (1968)
 Do Bhai (1968)
 Doosri Shadi (1968)
 Hamida (1968)
 Ismet (1968)
 Jawani Mastani (1968)
 Katari (1968)
 Main Kahan Manzil Kahan (1968)
 Main Zinda Hoon (1968)
 Mauj Behar (1968)
 Murad Baloch (1968)
 Pakeezah (1968)
 Shehanshah Jahangir (1968)
 Zalim (1968)
 Bhaiyan di Jodi (1969)
 Buzdil (1969)
 Dard (1969)
 Dilbar Jani (1969)
 Dildar (1969)
 Dillan Dey Souday (1969)
 Diya Aur Toofan (1969)
 Dulla Hyderi (1969)
 Ishq Na Puche Zat (1969)
 Jaggu (1969)
 Kunj Vichar Gaee Allaudin (1969)
 Lachchi (1969)
 Najo (1969)
 Nake Hindia Nira Pyar (1969)
 Pak Daman (1969)
 Pather te lik (1969)
 Qol-o-Qarar (1969)
 Sheran Di Jodi (1969)
 Tere Ishq Nachaya (1969)
 Zarqa (1969)
 Anwara (1970)
 Heer Ranjha (1970)
 Sajna Door Diya (1970)
 Shama Aur Parwana (1970) 
 Aasoo Billa (1971)
 Dosti (1971)Khan Chacha (1972) Do Pattar Annaran De (1972)Ishtahari Mulzim (1972) Sultan (1972) 
Ziddi (1973) Banarsi Thug (1973)  Sholay                Kaliyar  (1984) (his last film as an actor)
}}

As a producer
Some of his hits as a producer are Heer Ranjha (1970), Dosti (1971), Sholay (1984) and Maula Bakhsh'' (1988)

Other activities
He was elected as the vice president of the Pakistan Film Producers Association in Pakistan.

References

External links

1935 births
2021 deaths
Pakistani male film actors
Pakistani film producers
Punjabi people
Prisoners and detainees of the United Kingdom
Nigar Award winners